École des Ponts ParisTech (originally called École nationale des ponts et chaussées or ENPC, also nicknamed Ponts) is a university-level institution of higher education and research in the field of science, engineering and technology. Founded in 1747 by Daniel-Charles Trudaine, it is one of the oldest and one of the most prestigious French Grandes Écoles.

Historically, its primary mission has been to train engineering officials and civil engineers but the school now offers a wide-ranging education including computer science, applied mathematics, civil engineering, mechanics, finance, economics, innovation, urban studies, environment and transport engineering. École des Ponts is today largely international: 43% of its students obtain a double degree abroad, and 30% of an ingénieur cohort is foreign.

It is headquartered in Marne-la-Vallée (suburb of Paris), France, and is a founding member of ParisTech (Paris Institute of Technology) and of the Paris School of Economics. The school is under the Ministry of Ecology, Sustainable Development and Energy of France.

History

1747–1794: Origins 
Following the creation of the Corps of Bridges and Roads in 1716, the King's Council decided in 1747 to found a specific training course for the state's engineers, as École royale des ponts et chaussées. In 1775, the school took its current name as École nationale des ponts et chaussées, by Daniel-Charles Trudaine, in a moment when the state decided to set up a progressive and efficient control of the building of roads, bridges and canals, and in the training of civil engineers.

The school's first director, from 1747 until 1794, was Jean-Rodolphe Perronet, engineer, civil service administrator and a contributor to the Encyclopédie of Denis Diderot and Jean le Rond d'Alembert. Without lecturer, fifty students (among whom Lebon, Bernardin de Saint-Pierre, Pierre-Simon Girard, Riche de Prony, Méchain and Brémontier), initially taught themselves geometry, algebra, mechanics and hydraulics. Visits of building sites, cooperations with scientists and engineers and participation to the drawing of the map of the kingdom used to complete their training, which was usually four to twelve years long.

1794–1848: Growth and industrialisation 
During the First French Empire run by Napoleon I from 1804 to 1814, a number of members of the Corps of Bridges and Roads (including Barré de Saint-Venant, Belgrand, Biot, Cauchy, Coriolis, Dupuit, Fresnel, Gay-Lussac, Navier, Vicat) took part in the reconstruction of the French road network that had not been maintained during the Revolution, and in large infrastructural developments, notably hydraulic projects. Under the orders of the emperor, French scientist Gaspard Riche de Prony, second director of the school from 1798 to 1839, adapts the education provided by the school in order to improve the training of future civil engineers, whose purpose is to rebuild the major infrastructures of the country: roads, bridges, but also administrative buildings, barracks and fortifications. Prony is now considered as a historical and influential figure of the school.
During the twenty years that followed the First Empire, the experience of the faculty and the alumni involved in the reconstruction strongly influenced its training methods and internal organisation. In 1831, the school opens its first laboratory, which aims at concentrating the talents and experiences of the country's best civil engineers. The school also gradually becomes a place of reflection and debates for urban planning.

1848–1945: The big works 
As a new step in the evolution of the school, the decree of 1851 insists on the organisation of the courses, the writing of an annual schedule, the quality of the faculty, and the control of the students’ works. For the first time in its history, the school opens its doors to a larger public. At this time, in France, the remarkable development of transports, roads, bridges and canals is strongly influenced by engineers from the school (Becquerel, Bienvenüe, Caquot, Carnot, Colson, Coyne, Freyssinet, Résal, Séjourné), who deeply modernised the country by creating the large traffic networks, admired in several European countries.

1945–1997: Modernisation 
After the Second World War, the school focused on developing the link between economics and engineering. As civil engineering was requiring increasingly higher financial investments, the state needed engineers to be able to understand the economic situation of post-war Europe. From then on, the program of the school had three different aspects: scientific and technic, social, and economic.
Gradually, the number of admitted students increased in order to provide both the Corps of Bridges and Roads and the private sector highly trained young engineers. At the time, technical progress and considerable development of sciences and techniques used in building, urbanism and the protection of the environment imposed a change of strategy in the training programme. More specialisations were progressively created and the overall programme was adapted to national issues.

Academics 

École des Ponts is a Grande école, a French institution of higher education that is separate from, but parallel and connected to the main framework of the French public university system. Similar to the Ivy League in the United States, Oxbridge in the UK, and C9 League in China, Grandes Écoles are elite academic institutions that admit students through an extremely competitive process. Alums go on to occupy elite positions within government, administration, and corporate firms in France.

Although they are more expensive than public universities in France, Grandes Écoles typically have much smaller class sizes and student bodies, and many of their programs are taught in English. International internships, study abroad opportunities, and close ties with government and the corporate world are a hallmark of the Grandes Écoles. Many of the top ranked institutes and business schools in Europe are members of the Conférence des Grandes Écoles (CGE), as is École des Ponts; out of the 250 business schools in France, only 39 are CGE members.

École des Ponts offers high-level programmes in an extensive range of fields, with traditional competences in mathematics, computer science, civil engineering, mechanics, economics, finance, environment, transport, town & regional planning, logistics and innovation. It is among the schools called "généralistes", which means that students receive a broad, management-oriented and non-specialised education. The school also offers specialized/research masters and PhDs, and a design school, with programmes in innovation and startup creation. Degrees from École des Ponts are accredited by the Conférence des Grandes Écoles and awarded by the Ministry of National Education (France). Its Business School is further accredited by the elite international business school accrediting organizations and it holds double accreditation: The Association to Advance Collegiate Schools of Business (AACSB), and Association of MBAs (AMBA)

Ranking 

National ranking (ranked for its Master of Sciences in Engineering)

Times Higher Education ranked these Grandes Écoles in the top 10 worldwide (small universities: fewer than 5,000 students):

The Ingénieur programme

Curriculum 

This undergraduate-graduate engineering programme is the original and main programme offered by the school. It is quite different from typical university or college studies and specific to the French system of Grandes Écoles. The Ingénieur degree of École des Ponts – the Diplôme d'Ingénieur – is equivalent to a Master of Science (including a Bachelor of Science).

Admissions 

Admissions for engineering students is mostly done after scientific preparatory classes (MP, PSI, PC) through the highly selective "Mines-Ponts" competitive entrance exams. Some places are open each year to French and foreign university students as well as BCPST (biology) scientific preparatory classes

École des Ponts recruits among the top 4% of the students in preparatory classes.

Master's degrees 

École des Ponts offers a wide range of master's degrees, drawing on its historical domains of expertise. Some of them are in partnership with other high-profile institutions.

Applied Mathematics option

 Mathematics for finance and data (MFD)
 Mathematics, Vision, Learning (MVA)
 Modelling, Analysis, Simulation (MAS)
 Operational Research (RO)
 Probabilities and Random Models (PMA)

Energy option

 Energy Transition At Local Scale (TET)

Solid Mechanics option - co-accreditation with Sorbonne University

 Multiscale Approaches for Materials and Structures (AMMS)
 Durability of Materials and Structures (DMS)

Civil Engineering option - co-accreditation with UGE

 Mechanics of Soils, Rocks, and Structures in their Environment (MSROE)

Materials Science and Engineering option - co-accreditation with UGE

 Materials Science for Sustainable Construction (SMCD)

Transportation, Mobility, Networks option - co-accreditation with IP Paris, PSL, École d'Urbanisme de Paris (UGE & UPEC) 

 M1 Transportationb, Mobility, Networks
 Transportation, Mobility (TM)
 Transportation and Sustainable Development (TraDD)

Nuclear Engineering - co-accreditation with IP Paris, PSL and Université Paris Saclay

 Decommissioning and Waste Management 

Environmental, Energy, and Transportation Economics option - co-accreditation with Université Paris Saclay and Université Paris Nanterre

 Environmental Economics
 Economics of Energy
 Prospective Modeling
 Econonmics of transportation and mobility

Economic analysis and policy option - co-accreditation with Université Paris 1, PSL et EHESS

 Analysis and Political Economy (APE)

Applied Economics option - co-accreditation with PSL et EHESS

 Public Policies and Development (PPD) 

City and Urban Environment option - co-accreditation with UGE and CY Vergy

 Management and Environmental Services Engineering

Master of Science

 MSc - Master of Science Sustainable Impact of Analysis (SIA)

Executive masters programmes 

École des Ponts ParisTech's delivers 13 Executive Masters ("Mastère Spécialisé"):

 Digital Building Design (DBD)
 Sustainable Real Estate and Building, Energy and Digital Transitions (IBD)
 BIM, Integrated Design and Life Cycles of Buildings and Infrastructures (BIM)
 Spacial Planning and Urban Development  (AMUR)
 Civil Engineering and Ecoconception (GCE)
 Engineering of Large Energy Structures (GCGOE)
 Railway and Urban Transport System Engineering
 Smart Mobility
 Infrastructure Project Finance (IPF)
 Supply Chain Design and Management 
 Management of Energy Projects
 Public Policies and Actions for Sustainable Development (PAPDD)
 Advanced Public Action Morocco

PhDs 

The laboratories of the school host many PhD students (and classical CIFRE theses) wishing to engage in research, the financing of which is done mainly through corporate chairs. There were 40 PhDs awarded in 2021 to students working in the laboratories of the School and the Ecole des Ponts was welcoming, in 2021-2022, about 183 PhD students in its laboratories.
The Ingénieur programme students have the opportunity to complete their training with a PhD in the school's laboratories, or to prepare for it by pursuing a research Masters in these laboratories during their third year.

École des Ponts Business School 

École des Ponts Business School is the business school of École des Ponts. It offers five types of programmes: Undergraduate Programs in International Management, The fully accredited Solvay-Ponts full-time MBA, the Executive MBA, the recently launched Executive DBA and the Custom & Corporate Programme.

Students from École des Ponts benefit from the proximity with the business school in two ways: they can, in parallel to their engineering studies, take the business school's undergraduate "course in International Management (cIM)" and have the opportunity to pursue its MBA in their last year of study.
In coopération with the École nationale de l'aviation civile, the school offers an Executive MBA in aviation in Morocco and China.

The focus of the newly launched Executive-DBA is practical, rather than theoretical. The profile of applicants is therefore different than most PhD programs.

Paris at École des Ponts 

As part of the Ministry of Education and Research IDEFI (Excellence Initiatives for Innovative Training) programme, the school has created the first French design school.

 Paris at École des Ponts offers courses, notably through the ME310 programme in partnership with Stanford University, with a strong entrepreneurial dimension.

Corps of Bridges, Waters and Forests 

The Corps of Bridges, Waters and Forests is a technical Grand Corps of the French State (see Grands corps de l'Etat). People entering the Corps become officials and serve the French state.

Departments 
Education for the Ingénieur programme is organised in the six following departments:
 Civil and Structural Engineering n
 City, Environment, Transportation
 Mechanical Engineering and Materials Science
 Applied Mathematics and Computer Science
 Economics, Management, Finance
 Industrial Engineering

Partnerships

Partnerships with French institutions 

French academic partners
 Paris-Est Sup
 ParisTech
 Paris School of Economics
 PSL Research Institute
 École des ingénieurs de la Ville de Paris (EIVP)
 Écoles de formation du MEDDE
 Conférence des Grandes Écoles

French double-degree agreements

The school also allows students to pursue a double-degree in France with the following institutions:
 École d'Architecture Marne-la-Vallée
 École nationale de l'aviation civile
 ENS Paris-Saclay
 HEC Paris
 Science Po Paris
 Paris School of Economics
 Collège des Ingénieurs
 IFP School
 École des ingénieurs de la Ville de Paris

Partnerships with international institutions 

Over the years, École des Ponts ParisTech has developed institutional relationships with partners around the world and has signed cooperation agreements with other academic institutions. Among the choices available to students, it is possible to pursue a double-degree at a partner institution (4 continents, 23 countries, 33 universities in 2014) .
It is also possible to pursue exchange semesters within the framework of bilateral agreements (Berkeley, Georgia Tech, Imperial College or Erasmus exchanges), or research internships in the laboratories of the school's academic partners.
In particular, the school has very close ties with Brazil, China and Spain. In the second year of the Ingénieur programme, a third of the cohort comes from partner institutions.

Every year, many students get a double-degree in an establishment approved by the school, including leading universities in the United-States (Stanford, MIT, Berkeley, Princeton, Columbia), the United-Kingdom (London School of Economics, Imperial College, Oxford, Cambridge) and Asia (Tokyo University, NUS, HKU) .

One-way double-degree agreements 
Apart from exchange agreements with world high-level universities, École des Ponts offers every year to selected students from some universities of France's partner countries to pursue their studies and earn the École des Ponts degree besides their original university's degree. Universities with this form of partnership include the National Engineering School of Tunis from Tunisia, the École Hassania des travaux publics from Morocco and the Université Saint-Joseph de Beyrouth from Lebanon.

Research 
École des Ponts ParisTech runs research in the following disciplines (the names of corresponding research centres are in brackets):
 Atmospheric environment (CEREA)
 Water, urban planning and environment (LEESU)
 Mathematics and scientific computing (CERMICS)
 Computer science  (LIGM / IMAGINE)
 International environment and development (CIRED)
 Hydrology Meteorology and Complexity (HM&Co)
 Social sciences and spatial planning (LATTS)
 Regional planning and social sciences (LATTS)
 Dynamic meteorology (LMD)
 Fluid mechanics (LHSV)
 Urban planning and transport (LVMT)
 Economics (Paris-Jourdan Economics Laboratory)
 Mechanics and physics of materials and structures (Navier)

École des Ponts ParisTech was also the lead developer of Scilab along with INRIA. Scilab is now developed by the Scilab Consortium.

Alumni and faculty 

Alumni include (by alphabetical order, French unless indicated):
 Mohamed Abdeljalil, Moroccan Minister of Transport & Logistics
 Paul Andreu, architect
 Guy Béart, singer and songwriter
 Henri Becquerel, physicist
 Eugène Belgrand, engineer
 Fulgence Bienvenüe, chief engineer for the Paris Métro
 André Blondel, engineer and physicist
 Laurent-Emmanuel Calvet, economist
 Albert Caquot, civil engineer, considered the "best living French engineer" during half a century
 Marie François Sadi Carnot, French president from 1887 to 1894
 Jules Carvallo, civil engineer
 Augustin Louis Cauchy, mathematician
 Louis-Alexandre de Cessart, civil engineer
 Antoine de Chézy, hydrologist and civil engineer
 Gaspard-Gustave Coriolis, mathematician and physicist
 Charles Ellet, Jr., American civil engineer
 Augustin-Jean Fresnel, physicist

 Eugène Freyssinet, structural and civil engineer, pioneer of prestressed concrete
 Jean Gallier, computer scientist
 Émiland Gauthey, civil engineer, designer of bridges, canals and roads, uncle of Claude-Louis Navier
 Joseph Louis Gay-Lussac, chemist and physicist
 Hoàng Xuân Hãn, Vietnamese scholar, professor of mathematics, linguist, historian and educationalist
 Fouad Laroui, Moroccan economist and writer
 Alain Lipietz, economist and politician
 Charles Joseph Minard, civil engineer and pioneer of information graphics
 Claude-Louis Navier, engineer and physicist, known for Navier-Stokes equations
 Jean-Rodolphe Perronet, architect and structural engineer
 Antoine Picon, Professor of History of Architecture and Technology and co-director of doctoral programs (PhD & DDes) at Harvard Graduate School of Design
 Ambroise Roux, CEO of Compagnie générale d'électricité (later known as Alcatel) from 1970 to 1981
 Prince Souphanouvong, president of Laos from 1975 to 1991
 Jean Tirole, economist, Nobel prize in Economic Sciences in 2014
 Daniel-Charles Trudaine, administrator and civil engineer
 Pierre Veltz, academic and École des Ponts ParisTech's former director
 Louis Vicat, engineer, inventor of artificial cement
 Raul Salinas de Gortari, civil engineer, politician and businessman
 Juan Carlos García Pérez de Arce, architect, Minister of Public Works in Chile

Past and present faculty include:
 Étienne-Louis Boullée, architect
 Alexander Spiers, English lexicographer
 Yaarub Bader (يعرب بدر), previous Minister of Transportation in the Syrian Arab Republic

References

External links 
 Official site 

1747 establishments in France
6th arrondissement of Paris
Educational institutions established in 1747
Engineering universities and colleges in France
Grandes écoles
Historic Civil Engineering Landmarks
Marne-la-Vallée
ParisTech
Schools in Paris